Germany has a universal multi-payer health care system paid for by a combination of statutory health insurance and private health insurance.

The turnover of the national health sector was about US$368.78 billion (€287.3 billion) in 2010, equivalent to 11.6 percent of gross domestic product (GDP) and about US$4,505 (€3,510) per capita. According to the World Health Organization, Germany's health care system was 77% government-funded and 23% privately funded as of 2004. In 2004 Germany ranked thirtieth in the world in life expectancy (78 years for men). It was tied for eighth place in the number of practicing physicians, at 3.3 per 1,000 persons. It also had very low infant mortality rate (4.7 per 1,000 live births). In 2001 total spending on health amounted to 10.8 percent of gross domestic product.

According to the Euro health consumer index, which placed it in seventh position in its 2015 survey, Germany has long had the most restriction-free and consumer-oriented healthcare system in Europe. Patients are allowed to seek almost any type of care they wish whenever they want it. In 2017, the governmental health system in Germany kept a record reserve of more than €18 billion which made it one of the healthiest healthcare systems in the world at the time.

History

1883
Germany has the world's oldest national social health insurance system, with origins dating back to Otto von Bismarck's social legislation, which included the Health Insurance Bill of 1883, Accident Insurance Bill of 1884, and Old Age and Disability Insurance Bill of 1889. Bismarck stressed the importance of three key principles; solidarity, the government is responsible for ensuring access by those who need it, subsidiarity, policies are implemented with the smallest political and administrative influence, and corporatism, the government representative bodies in health care professions set out procedures they deem feasible. Mandatory health insurance originally applied only to low-income workers and certain government employees, but has gradually expanded to cover the great majority of the population.

1883–1970
Unemployment insurance was introduced in 1927. In 1932, the Berlin treaty (1926) expired and Germany's modern healthcare system started shortly after the expiration of Berlin Treaty. 1935, Gerhard Domagk discovers sulfonamides. In 1956, Laws on Statutory health insurance (SHI) for pensioners come into effect.
New laws came in effect in 1972 to help finance and manage hospitals. In 1974 SHI covered students, artists, farmers and disabled living shelters. Between 1977 and 1983 several cost laws were enacted. Long-term care insurance (Pflegeversicherung) was introduced in 1995.

1976–present
Since 1976 the government has convened an annual commission, composed of representatives of business, labor, physicians, hospitals, and insurance and pharmaceutical industries. The commission takes into account government policies and makes recommendations to regional associations with respect to overall expenditure targets. In 1986 expenditure caps were implemented and were tied to the age of the local population as well as the overall wage increases. Although reimbursement of providers is on a fee-for-service basis the amount to be reimbursed for each service is determined retrospectively to ensure that spending targets are not exceeded. Capitated care, such as that provided by U.S. health maintenance organizations, has been considered as a cost-containment mechanism but would require consent of regional medical associations, and has not materialized.

Copayments were introduced in the 1980s in an attempt to prevent overutilization and control costs. The average length of hospital stay in Germany has decreased in recent years from 14 days to 9 days, still considerably longer than average stays in the U.S. (5 to 6 days). The difference is partly driven by the fact that hospital reimbursement is chiefly a function of the number of hospital days as opposed to procedures or the patient's diagnosis. Drug costs have increased substantially, rising nearly 60% from 1991 through 2005. Despite attempts to contain costs, overall health care expenditures rose to 10.7% of GDP in 2005, comparable to other western European nations, but substantially less than that spent in the U.S. (nearly 16% of GDP).

As of 2009, the system is decentralized with private practice physicians providing ambulatory care, and independent, mostly non-profit hospitals providing the majority of inpatient care. Approximately 92% of the population are covered by a 'Statutory Health Insurance' plan, which provides a standardized level of coverage through any one of approximately 1,100 public or private sickness funds. Standard insurance is funded by a combination of employee contributions, employer contributions and government subsidies on a scale determined by income level. Higher-income workers sometimes choose to pay a tax and opt-out of the standard plan, in favor of 'private' insurance. The latter's premiums are not linked to income level but instead to health status. Historically, the level of provider reimbursement for specific services is determined through negotiations between regional physicians' associations and sickness funds.

Regulation

The German healthcare system is regulated by the Federal Joint Committee (Gemeinsamer Bundesausschuss), a public health organization authorized to make binding regulations growing out of health reform bills passed by lawmakers, along with routine decisions regarding healthcare in Germany. The Federal Joint Committee consists of 13 members, who are entitled to vote on these binding regulations. The members composed of legal representatives of the public health insurances, the hospitals, the doctors and dentists and three impartial members. Also, there are five representatives of the patients with an advisory role who are not allowed to vote.

The German law about the public health insurance sets the framework agreement for the committee. One of the most important tasks is to decide which treatments and performances the insurances have to pay for by law. The principle about these decisions is that every treatment and performance has to be required, economic, sufficient and appropriate.

Health insurance 

Since 2009, health insurance has been compulsory for the whole population in Germany, when coverage was expanded from the majority of the population to everyone.

As of 2021, salaried workers and employees who make less than €64,350 per year or €5,362.50 per month are automatically enrolled into one of currently around 105 public non-profit "sickness funds". The fund has a common rate for all members, and is paid for with joint employer-employee contributions. The employer pays half of the contribution, and the employee pays the other half.  Insured persons can also choose optional plans that include higher deductibles and are therefore cheaper. Plans that include high reimbursements if no medical services are used are also possible. In addition, insured persons can forego certain services with some health insurance companies and choose cheaper plans. Self-employed workers and those who are unemployed without benefits must pay the entire contribution themselves. Provider payment is negotiated in complex corporatist social bargaining among specified self-governed bodies (e.g. physicians' associations) at the level of federal states (Länder). The sickness funds are mandated to provide a unique and broad benefit package and cannot refuse membership or otherwise discriminate on an actuarial basis. Social welfare beneficiaries are also enrolled in statutory health insurance, and municipalities pay contributions on their behalf.

Besides the statutory health insurance, which covers the vast majority of residents, some residents can instead choose private health insurance: those with a yearly income above €64,350 (2022, unchanged from 2021), students and civil servants. About 11% of the population has private health insurance. Most civil servants benefit from a tax-funded government employee benefit scheme that covers a percentage of the costs, and cover the rest of the costs with a private insurance contract. Recently, private insurers provide various types of supplementary coverage as an add upon of the SHI benefit package (e.g. for glasses, coverage abroad and additional dental care or more sophisticated dentures). Health insurance in Germany is split in several parts. The remaining 11% opt for private health insurance, including government employees.

Public health insurance contributions are based on the worker's salary. Private insurers charge risk-related contributions. This may result in substantial savings for younger individuals in good health. With age, private contributions tend to rise and a number of individuals formerly cancelled their private insurance plan in order to return to statutory health insurance; this option is now only possible for beneficiaries under 55 years.

Reimbursement for outpatient care was previously on a fee-for-service basis but has changed into basic capitation according to the number of patients seen during one quarter, with a capped overall spending for outpatient treatments and region. Moreover, regional panel physician associations regulate number of physicians allowed to accept Statutory Health Insurance in a given area. Co-payments, which exist for medicines and other items are relatively low compared to other countries.

Insurance systems 

Germany has a universal system with two main types of health insurance. Germans are offered three mandatory health benefits, which are co-financed by employer and employee: health insurance, accident insurance, and long-term care insurance.

Accident insurance for working accidents is covered by the employer and basically covers all risks for commuting to work and at the workplace.

Long-term care insurance is covered half and half by employer and employee and covers cases in which a person is not able to manage their daily routine (provision of food, cleaning of apartment, personal hygiene, etc.). It is about 2% of a yearly salaried income or pension, with employers matching the contribution of the employee.

There are two separate types of health insurance: public health insurance and private insurance. Both systems struggle with the increasing cost of medical treatment and the changing demography. About 87.5% of the persons with health insurance are members of the public system, while 12.5% are covered by private insurance (as of 2006).

In 2013 a state funded private care insurance was introduced. Insurance contracts that fit certain criteria are subsidized by €60 per year. It is expected that the number of contracts will grow from 400,000 by end of 2013 to over a million within the next few years. These contracts have been criticized by consumer rights foundations.

Insuring organizations 
The German federal legislature has reduced the number of public health insurance organizations from 1209 in 1991 down to 123 in 2015.

As long as a person has the right to choose health insurance, they can join any insurance that is willing to include them.

Public insurance

Regular salaried employees must have public health insurance unless their income exceeds €64,350 per year (2021). This is referred to as the compulsory insurance limit. If their income exceeds that amount, they can choose to have private health insurance instead. Freelancers and self-employed persons can have public or private insurance, regardless of their income. Public health insurers are not forced to accept self-employed persons, which can create difficulties for foreign freelancers, who can get refused by both public and private health insurers. Since health insurance coverage is a requirement for their residence permit, they can be forced to leave the country.

In the public system, the premium
 is set by the Federal Ministry of Health based on a fixed set of covered services as described in the German Social Law ( – SGB), which limits those services to "economically viable, sufficient, necessary and meaningful services";
 is not dependent on an individual's health condition, but a percentage (currently 14.6%, 7.3% of which is covered by the employer) of salaried income under €64,350 per year (in 2021). Additionally, each public health insurance provider charges an additional contribution rate, which is 1.3% on average (2021), but goes up to 2.7%;
 includes family members of any family members, or "registered member" ( – i.e., husband/wife and children are free);
 is a "pay as you go" system – there is no saving for an individual's higher health costs with rising age or existing conditions. Instead, the solidarity principle applies in which the current active generation pays forward for the costs of the current retired generation.

Private insurance
In the private system, the premium
 is based on an individual agreement between the insurance company and the insured person defining the set of covered services and the percentage of coverage;
 depends on the amount of services chosen and the person's risk and age of entry into the private system;
 is used to build up savings for the rising health costs at higher age (as required by law). This is otherwise known as aging provisions (Alterungsrückstellungen).

For persons who have opted out of the public health insurance system to get private health insurance, it can prove difficult to subsequently go back to the public system, since this is only possible under certain circumstances, for example if they are not yet 55 years of age and their income drops below the level required for private selection. Since private health insurance is usually more expensive than public health insurance, although not always, the higher premiums must then be paid out of a lower income. During the last twenty years private health insurance became more and more expensive and less efficient compared with the public insurance.

In Germany, all privately financed products and services for health are assigned as part of the 'second health market'. Unlike the 'first health market' they are usually not paid by a public or private health insurance. Patients with public health insurance paid privately about €1.5 billion in this market segment in 2011, while already 82% of physicians offered their patients in their practices individual services being not covered by the patient's insurances; the benefits of these services are controversial discussed. Private investments in fitness, for wellness, assisted living, and health tourism are not included in this amount. The 'second health market' in Germany is compared to the United States still relatively small, but is growing continuously.

Self-payment (international patients without any national insurance coverage) 
Besides the primary governmental health insurance and the secondary private health insurance mentioned above, all governmental and private clinics generally work in an inpatient setting with a prepayment system, requiring a cost estimate that needs to be covered before the perspective therapy can be planned. Several university hospitals in Germany have therefore country-specific quotes for pre-payments that can differ from 100% to the estimated costs and the likelihood of unexpected additional costs, i.e. due to risks for medical complications.

Economics
Health economics in Germany can be considered as a collective term for all activities that have anything to do with health in this country. This interpretation done by Andreas Goldschmidt in 2002 seems, however, very generous due to several overlaps with other economic sectors. Around it is located wholesale and supplier sector with pharmaceutical industry, medical technology, healthcare, and wholesale trade of medical products. Health-related margins are the fitness and spa facilities, assisted living, and health tourism.

According to this basic idea, an almost totally regulated health care market like in the UK would not be very productive, but also a largely deregulated market as in the United States would not be optimal. Both systems would suffer concerning sustainable and comprehensive patient care. Only a hybrid of social well-balanced and competitive market conditions created a relevant optimum. Nevertheless, forces of the healthcare market in Germany are often regulated by a variety of amendments and health care reforms at the legislative level, especially by the Social Security Code (Sozialgesetzbuch- SGB) in the past 30 years.

Health care, including its industry and all services, is one of the largest sectors of the German economy. Direct inpatient and outpatient care equivalent to just about a quarter of the entire 'market' – depending on the perspective. A total of 4.4 million people working in this, that means about one in ten employees in 2007 and 2008. The total expenditure in health economics was about €287.3 billion in Germany in 2010, equivalent to 11.6 percent of gross domestic product (GDP) this year and about €3,510 per capita.

Drugs costs
The pharmaceutical industry plays a major role in Germany within and beyond direct health care. Expenditure on pharmaceutical drugs is almost half of those for the entire hospital sector. Pharmaceutical drug expenditure grew by an annual average of 4.1% between 2004 and 2010. Such developments caused numerous health care reforms since the 1980s. An actual example of 2010 and 2011: First time since 2004 the drug expenditure fell from €30.2 billion in 2010 to €29.1 billion in 2011, i.e. a fall of €1.1 billion or 3.6%. That was caused by restructuring the Social Security Code: manufacturer discount 16% instead of 6%, price moratorium, increasing discount contracts, increasing discount by wholesale trade and pharmacies.

As of 2010, Germany has used reference pricing and incorporates cost sharing to charge patients more when a drug is newer and more effective than generic drugs. However, as of 2013 total out-of-costs for medications are capped at 2% of income, and 1% of income for people with chronic diseases.

Statistics 

In a sample of 13 developed countries Germany was seventh in its population weighted usage of medication in 14 classes in 2009 and tenth in 2013. The drugs studied were selected on the basis that the conditions treated had high incidence, prevalence and/or mortality, caused significant long-term morbidity and incurred high levels of expenditure and significant developments in prevention or treatment had been made in the last 10 years. The study noted considerable difficulties in cross border comparison of medication use.  It has the highest number of dentists in Europe – 64,287 in 2015.

Major diagnoses
In 2002, the top diagnosis for male patients released from the hospital was heart disease, followed by alcohol-related disorders and hernias. For women, a 2020 study lists the three most common diagnoses as heart disease, dementia and cardiovascular diseases.

In 2016, an epidemiological study highlighted significant differences among the 16 federal states of Germany in terms of prevalence and mortality for the major cardiovascular diseases (CVD). The prevalence of major CVD was negatively correlated with the number of cardiologists, whereas it did not show any correlation with the number of primary care providers, general practitioners or non-specialized internists. A more relevant positive relation was found between the prevalence or mortality of major CVD and the number of residents per chest pain unit. Bremen, Saarland and the former East German states had higher prevalence and mortality rates for major CVD and lower mean lifespan durations.

Hospitals
Types:

There are three main types of hospital in the German healthcare system:

 Public hospitals (öffentliche Krankenhäuser).
 Charitable hospitals (frei gemeinnützige Krankenhäuser).
 Private hospitals (Privatkrankenhäuser).

The average length of hospital stay in Germany has decreased in recent years from 14 days to 9 days, still considerably longer than average stays in the United States (5 to 6 days). Drug costs have increased substantially, rising nearly 60% from 1991 through 2005. Despite attempts to contain costs, overall health care expenditures rose to 10.7% of GDP in 2005, comparable to other western European nations, but substantially less than that spent in the U.S. (nearly 16% of GDP).

In 2017 the BBC reported that compared with the United Kingdom the Caesarean rate, the use of MRI for diagnosis and the length of hospital stay are all higher in Germany.

Waiting times and capacity 
According to several sources from the past decade, waiting times in Germany remain low for appointments and surgery, although a minority of elective surgery patients face longer waits. In 1992, a study by Fleming et al. (cited in Siciliani & Hurst, 2003, p. 8), 19.4% of German respondents said they had waited more than 12 weeks for their surgery.

In the Commonwealth Fund 2010 Health Policy Survey in 11 countries, Germany reported some of the lowest waiting times. Germans had the highest percentage of patients reporting their last specialist appointment took less than 4 weeks (83%, vs. 80% for the U.S.), and the second-lowest reporting it took 2 months or more (7%, vs. 5% for Switzerland and 9% for the U.S.). 70% of Germans reported that they waited less than 1 month for elective surgery, the highest percentage, and the lowest percentage (0%) reporting it took 4 months or more.

Both Social Health Insurance (SHI) and privately insured patient experienced low waits, but privately insured patients' waits were even lower. According to the National Association of Statutory Health Insurance Physicians (KBV), the body representing contract physicians and contract psychotherapists at federal level, 56% of Social Health Insurance patients waited 1 week or less, while only 13% waited longer than 3 weeks for a doctor's appointment. 67% of privately insured patients waited 1 week or less, while 7% waited longer than 3 weeks. Waits can also vary somewhat by region. Waits were longer in eastern Germany according to the KBV (KBV, 2010), as cited in "Health at a Glance 2011: OECD Indicators".

Germany has a large hospital sector capacity measured in beds: it has the highest rate of intensive care beds among high income countries and the highest rate of overall hospital capacity in Europe. High capacity on top of significant day surgery outside of hospitals (especially for ophthalmology and orthopaedic surgery) with doctors paid fee-for-service for activity performed are likely factors preventing long waits, despite hospital budget limitations. Activity-based payment for hospitals also is linked to low waiting times (Siciliani & Hurst, 2003, 33–34, 70). Germany introduced Diagnosis-Related Group activity-based payment for hospitals (with a soft cap budget limit).

See also 
 Arzneimittelmarkt-Neuordnungsgesetz
 Health in Germany
 Health care compared
 Health care system of the elderly in Germany
 Reformhaus
 Universal health care

Notes

References

 
Welfare in Germany
Articles containing video clips